Schin op Geul (Limburgish: Sjin) is a village in the Dutch province of Limburg. It is located in the municipality of Valkenburg aan de Geul, about 3 km southeast of the town of Valkenburg.

History 
The village was first mentioned in the middle of the 11th century as de Schina. The etymology is unclear.

The Catholic St Maurice Church is a three aisled basilica-like church. It contains elements which are probably from the 11th century. The tower and the north aisle collapsed in 1762 and were rebuilt in 1768. In 1926, the choir was rebuilt.

Schin op Geul was home to 92 people in 1840. In 1853, the Schin op Geul railway station opened on the Aachen to Maastricht railway line. In 1915, a railway line to Heerlen was added. The line to Aachen closed in 1992. It served by Veolia

Schin op Geul was a separate municipality until 1940, when it was merged with Valkenburg. In 1982, it became part of the municipality of Valkenburg aan de Geul.

In 2004 it was the venue for the Linuxbierwanderung.

Gallery

Notable people
 Frans van Balkom, footballer and manager (1939–2015)
 Hans Coumans, painter (1943–1986)

References

External links

Populated places in Limburg (Netherlands)
Former municipalities of Limburg (Netherlands)
Valkenburg aan de Geul